Cathartornis is an ancient bird of the Teratornithidae family. It lived somewhere between 23 million years (Miocene Epoch) and 10,000 years (Pleistocene Epoch) ago. The only evidence of the bird's existence is a few bones. Its remains were documented in 1910. Cathartornis was described on the basis of 2 tarsometatarsi, 1 complete and 1 containing only the distal end, recovered from the Pleistocene La Brea Tar Pits in Southern California. Since then, no other fossils have officially been referred to the taxon, though some fossils assigned to Teratornis could be from Cathartornis and unpublished remains have been mentioned.

References

Cenozoic birds
Teratornithidae